The Samsung Miniket was a line of multifunction devices sold from March 2005 through mid-2007 in Australia (and possibly other markets). It bundles together a video camera, SVGA (Super Video Graphics Array) digital camera, an MP3 player, voice recorder, memory stick and Web cam, but had neither cellular nor wifi connectivity, though it did provide for USB access.  It came in four models (VP-M110B, VP-M110S, VP-X110L, VP-M2100)—with internal storage capacity of 1 GB. Models weigh as little as 147 grams.

References

External links
Samsung MINIKET
SAMSUNG's Digital World - Digital Video Camera
SAMSUNG's Digital World - Digital Video Camera | VP-M110B
SAMSUNG's Digital World - Digital Video Camera | VP-M110S
SAMSUNG's Digital World - Digital Video Camera | VP-X110L
SAMSUNG's Digital World - Digital Video Camera | VP-M2100

Samsung Electronics products